Newton Santos de Oliveira (born 24 July 1976), or simply Newton, is a former footballer who played as a striker. Born in Brazil, Newton is of Lebanese descent; he represented Lebanon internationally at the 2000 AFC Asian Cup.

Club career
Newton was born in Rio de Janeiro, the second largest city of Brazil.

According to the annual reports of international transfers and returns to Brazil made by the Brazilian Football Confederation, he was transferred from Associação Atlética Portuguesa (RJ) to the Saudi Arabian side Al-Wahda on December 26, 2002; from CFZ do Rio to Al-Akhaa Al-Ahli on October 25, 2004; from Al-Akhaa Al-Ahli to Associação Atlética Portuguesa (RJ) on March 20, 2006; from Associação Atlética Portuguesa (RJ) to the Malaysian team Penang FA on April 10, 2006 and from Penang FA to Associação Atlética Portuguesa (RJ) on March 28, 2007.

International career
Newton formerly represented the Lebanon national football team at the 2000 AFC Asian Cup.

See also
 List of Lebanon international footballers born outside Lebanon

References

External links
 
 

1976 births
Living people
Brazilian people of Lebanese descent
Sportspeople of Lebanese descent
Footballers from Rio de Janeiro (city)
Brazilian emigrants to Lebanon
Citizens of Lebanon through descent
Brazilian footballers
Lebanese footballers
Association football forwards
Associação Atlética Portuguesa (RJ) players
Lebanese Premier League players
Al Ansar FC players
Lebanese expatriate footballers
Expatriate footballers in Saudi Arabia
Lebanese expatriate sportspeople in Saudi Arabia
Brazilian expatriate sportspeople in Saudi Arabia
Saudi First Division League players
Al-Wehda Club (Mecca) players
Centro de Futebol Zico players
Akhaa Ahli Aley FC players
Expatriate footballers in Malaysia
Lebanese expatriate sportspeople in Malaysia
Brazilian expatriate sportspeople in Malaysia
Malaysia Super League players
Penang F.C. players
Lebanon international footballers
2000 AFC Asian Cup players